Podgrad pri Vremah is a settlement in the Municipality of Divača in the Littoral region of Slovenia.

Name
The name of the settlement was changed from Podgrad-Potok to Podgrad pri Vremah in 1955.

References

External links

Podgrad pri Vremah on Geopedia

Populated places in the Municipality of Divača